F24 may refer to:

Vehicle 
Aircraft
 Douglas F-24, an American carrier-based aircraft
 Fairchild 24, an American high-wing aircraft
 Fokker F.XXIV, a Dutch passenger airliner
 Supermarine Spitfire F.24, a British aircraft

Ships and boats
 , a Mariscal Sucre-class frigate of the Venezuelan Navy
 Farrier F-24, an American trimaran boat
 , a frigate of the Royal Malaysian Navy
 , a Tribal-class destroyer of the Royal Navy

Other uses 
 F24 camera, a British aerial reconnaissance camera
 Fluorine-24 (24F), an isotope of fluorine
 France 24, an international news and current affairs television channel